Nick van der Meer (born 18 January 1985) is a retired Dutch professional tennis player.

Van der Meer reached a career high ATP singles ranking of World No. 332 achieved on 25 June 2012. He also had a career high ATP doubles ranking of World No. 444 achieved on 19 October 2009. 

Van der Meer made his ATP Tour main draw debut in singles at the 2004 Dutch Open held on clay courts in Amersfoort, Netherlands. He received a wild card entry into the first round of the singles draw,  where he was defeated by seventh seeded Spaniard Alberto Martin in straight sets 0–6, 4–6.

Van der Meer reached 13 career singles finals with a record of 7 wins and 6 losses all occurring on the ITF Futures circuit. Additionally, he has reached 9 career doubles finals, with a record of 2 wins and 7 losses which includes a 0–1 record in ATP Challenger finals.

ATP Challenger and ITF Futures finals

Singles: 13 (7–6)

Doubles: 9 (2–7)

References

External links
 
 

1985 births
Living people
Dutch male tennis players
20th-century Dutch people